The Enterprise Europe Network provides support for Small and Medium-sized Enterprises (SMEs) with international ambitions. Co-funded by the European Union's COSME and Horizon 2020 programmes, the Network's aim is to help businesses innovate and grow internationally.

The Network is active in more than 60 countries worldwide. It brings together 3,000 experts from more than 600 member organisations, including:

 chambers of commerce and industry
 technology poles
 innovation support organisations
 universities and research institutes
 regional development organisations

Advice for international growth 
Enterprise Europe Network advisory services support businesses seeking to expand into international markets. The services cover a wide range of regulatory areas and market intelligence:

 Compliance with EU regulations and standards (e.g. CE marking)
 Access to international markets – market intelligence and capacity building
 International public contracts –access to cross-border procurement and EU tender opportunities 
 National and regional finance and funding – identification of sources of finance and investor-readiness training
 EU funding schemes and application support
Intellectual property rights (IPR) – patents and IPR applications and exploitation strategies
 Energy and resource efficiency –  identification of technologies and finance opportunities 
 Management improvement – capacity building

Support for business innovation 
Enterprise Europe Network innovation support services are available based on an assessment of the needs and development phase of the business.

At an entry level, Network services include:

 information on innovation-related policies, legislation and support programmes
 links with local innovation stakeholders
 information about access to local sources of funding/support

Network experts can provide one-to-one services to support innovation capacity building. Services include innovation audits, advice on intellectual property, marketing and access to finance.

Finally, the Network provides key account management services to businesses benefitting from the Horizon 2020 SME instrument programme, part of the European Innovation Council (EIC) pilot.

History 
The Enterprise Europe Network was launched on 7 February 2008 by former EU Commissioner Günter Verheugen. The Enterprise Europe Network combines the previous Euro Info Centres and the Innovation Relay Centres. From 2008 to 2014, the Network was co-financed by the EU's Competitiveness and Innovation Framework Programme (CIP), in cooperation with institutions at national and regional levels. From 2015 to 2020, the Network is co-financed under the European Union's programme for the competitiveness of SMEs (COSME) and Horizon 2020.

Under the responsibility of the European Commission's Directorate-General for Internal Market, Industry, Entrepreneurship and SMEs, the Enterprise Europe Network is managed by the Executive Agency for Small and Medium-sized Enterprises (EASME).

Media coverage 
La rete Ue Een aiuti a 2,6 milioni pmi (ansa.it economia, Italy)

Pmi, supporto a 2,6 milioni aziende da rete Ue Een (ilsole24ore.com, Italy)

Apre alle start up la rete europea che aiuta le impresse a crescere (larepubblica.it, Italy)

Scots firms export their green-energy expertise to Chile (energyvoice.com, UK)

Start-ups: Learning to walk before you run (irishtimes.com, Ireland)

Irish companies to get free access to Europe's largest opportunities database (businesspost.ie, Ireland)

La UCLM informa a las pymes de opportunidades europeas en innovación (eldiario.es, Spain)

Les TPE pourront-elles bientôt exporter vers les Etats-Unis? (lesechos.fr, France)

References

External links
 Official Enterprise Europe Network Website
 Final evaluation of the impact of the Enterprise Europe Network 2008-2014 (executive summary): 
 Final evaluation of the impact of the Enterprise Europe Network 2008-2014 (full report): 
Interim Evaluation of the COSME Programme Final Report: .

International organizations based in France
Organizations related to small and medium-sized enterprises
Pan-European trade and professional organizations